The Essential Richard Marx is a compilation album by Richard Marx released in 2000. It includes songs from his first three albums, most of which were hit singles.

Track listing
All songs written by Richard Marx, except where noted.

 "Should've Known Better"
 "Don't Mean Nothing" (Marx/Gaitsch)
 "Too Late Too Say Goodbye" (Marx/Waybill)
 "Hazard"
 "Lonely Heart" (Marx/Waybill)
 "Remember Manhattan" (Marx/Waybill)
 "Heaven Only Knows" (Marx)
 "Right Here Waiting" (Marx)
 "Children of the Night"
 "That Was Lulu" (Marx/Pitchford)
 "Nothing You Can Do About It" (Marx)
 "Endless Summer Nights" (Marx)

2000 compilation albums
Richard Marx albums
Albums produced by Richard Marx
Compilation albums by American artists